Always Will Be is a song by the Swedish Power and Heavy metal band HammerFall, the second single from their album Renegade. It was released as a card sleeve CD single on 27 November 2000. The single has two songs "Always Will Be" and "The Fallen One" (both of them are ballads) and the last two tracks (marked with an * in the track listing below) are found on the limited Digi-pack CD single. Both these releases were only sold in Sweden and through the Nuclear Blast mailorder.

It ranked 50th in the Swedish music charts.

Track listing

The track "Always Will Be" was also made into a music video 
The track "Breaking the Law" features a 'special' line-up where each band member plays a different instrument.

Personnel
Joacim Cans      - Vocals, guitars on "Breaking the Law"
Oscar Dronjak    - Guitars, vocals on "Breaking the Law"
Stefan Elmgren   - Guitars, drums on "Breaking the Law"
Magnus Rosén     - Bass, guitars on "Breaking the Law"
Anders Johansson - Drums, bass on "Breaking the Law"

Release information
A Digi-pack limited CD single was released on April 9, 2001 and contains two extra tracks: "Always Will Be (Acoustic Version)" and "Breaking the Law".
A limited 7" Vinyl, Shape, Picture disc edition released in 2001 has two tracks on it: "Always Will Be" on the A-side and "Always Will Be (Acoustic Version)" on the B-side.

External links
Official HammerFall website
Lyrics at Darklyrics

References

2000 songs
HammerFall songs
Nuclear Blast Records singles
2000 singles
Songs written by Oscar Dronjak
Heavy metal ballads